King's Standing Bowl Barrow or Kingstanding Mound, is a scheduled monument in the Kingstanding area of Birmingham. It comprises the buried and earthwork remains of a bowl barrow from the late Neolithic to the late Bronze Age, lying alongside the Icknield Street Roman road to the South of Sutton Park.

It is reputedly the site from where King Charles I reviewed his troops on 18 October 1642, during the English Civil War; from which event both the mound and the area take their name.

References

Scheduled monuments in the West Midlands (county)
Kingstanding
Barrows in the United Kingdom